Podstenje is a village north of Ilirska Bistrica in the Inner Carniola region of Slovenia.

The local church in the settlement is dedicated to Saint Anthony of Padua and belongs to the Parish of Ilirska Bistrica.

References

External links
Podstenje on Geopedia

Populated places in the Municipality of Ilirska Bistrica